Ayy is one of the districts of Karak governorate, Jordan.

References 

Districts of Jordan